This list of expressways in the Philippines is currently composed of 10 controlled-access highways that connects Metro Manila to the provinces located in north and south Luzon. While not all expressways are interconnected, there is a plan to connect all expressways to form the Philippine expressway network.

Since 2020, all expressways are connected to at least one other expressway.

Numbered routes
{| class="wikitable sortable"
! Number
! Length (km)
! Length (mi)
! Northern/eastern terminus
! Southern/western terminus
! Local names
! Formed
! Removed
! class="unsortable" | Notes
|-
! 
| 88.4
| 54.9
| Route 213 (Mabalacat–Magalang Road) in Santa Ines, Mabalacat, Pampanga
| Route 1 (EDSA)/Route 160 (Andres Bonifacio Avenue) in Balintawak, Quezon City
| North Luzon Expressway
| 2014
| current
| Asian Highway 26 between Santa Rita, Guiguinto and Balintawak
|-
! 
| 132.5
| 82.3
| Route 2 (Manila North Road) in Rosario, La Union
| E1 (North Luzon Expressway) in Mabalacat, Pampanga
| 
| 2014
| current
|
|-
! 
| 92
| 57
| Route 1 (EDSA)/Route 145 (Osmeña Highway) in Makati
| Route 4 (Jose P. Laurel Highway)/Route 434 (Batangas Port Diversion Road) in Balagtas, Batangas City
| 
| 2014
| current
| Asian Highway 26 between Magallanes and Calamba
|-
! 
| 42.79
| 26.59
| E1 (North Luzon Expressway) in Caloocan
| E2 (South Luzon Expressway) in Muntinlupa
| Skyway
| 2014
| current
| Partially signed as E2/Asian Highway 26 between Buendia, Makati and Alabang, Muntinlupa
|-
! 
| 7.7
| 4.8
| Route 11 (C-5 Road) in Taguig
| E3 (CAVITEX) in San Dionisio, Parañaque
| C-5 Southlink Expressway
| 2019
| current
| Partial operation between C-5 and Pasay (near Merville)
|-
! 
| 2.7
| 1.7
| E2 (South Luzon Expressway) in Muntinlupa
| Daang Hari in Poblacion, Muntinlupa
| Muntinlupa–Cavite Expressway
| 2015
| current
| Spur route of E2
|-
! 
| bgcolor=#FFDEAD | 32.6
| bgcolor=#FFDEAD | 20.2
| bgcolor=#FFDEAD | E2 (Skyway) in Taguig
| bgcolor=#FFDEAD | Batasan Road in Batasan Hills, Quezon City
| bgcolor=#FFDEAD | Southeast Metro Manila Expressway
| bgcolor=#FFDEAD | proposed
| bgcolor=#FFDEAD | —
| bgcolor=#FFDEAD |
|-
! 
| 14
| 8.7
| E6 (NAIA Expressway)/Route 61 (Roxas Boulevard)/Route 194 (NAIA Road) in Tambo, Parañaque
| Route 62 (Tirona Highway)/Route 64 (Centennial Road) in Kawit, Cavite
| Manila–Cavite Expressway
| 2014
| current
| 
|-
! 
| 44.6
| 27.6
| E3 (CAVITEX) in Kawit, Cavite
| E2 (South Luzon Expressway) in Biñan, Laguna
| Cavite–Laguna Expressway
| 2019
| current
| Partial operation between Silang East, Silang and Mamplasan, Biñan
|-
! 
| 58.7
| 36.5
| E1 in Mabalacat, Pampanga
| Rizal Highway and Maritan Highway in Subic Freeport
| 
| 2014
| current
| 
|-
! 
| 13.4
| 8.3
| Route 128 (Mindanao Avenue) in Ugong, Valenzuela
| Route 120 (R-10) in Navotas
| 
| 2014
| current
| 
|-
! 
| 11.9
| 7.4
| E2 (Skyway) in Taguig
| Macapagal Boulevard in Parañaque
| NAIA Expressway
| 2016
| current
|

Unnumbered routes 
{| class="wikitable sortable"
! Name
! Length (km)
! Length (mi)
! Northern/eastern terminus
! Southern/western terminus
! Formed
! Removed
! class="unsortable" | Notes
|-
! Camarines Sur Expressway
| bgcolor=#FFDEAD | 15.2
| bgcolor=#FFDEAD | 9.4
| bgcolor=#FFDEAD | Route 1 (Maharlika Highway) in San Fernando, Camarines Sur
| bgcolor=#FFDEAD | Route 1 (Maharlika Highway) in Pili, Camarines Sur
| bgcolor=#FFDEAD | proposed
| bgcolor=#FFDEAD | —
| bgcolor=#FFDEAD |
|-
! Cebu–Cordova Link Expressway
| 8.9
| 5.5
| Route 845 (Manuel L. Quezon National Highway) in Cordova, Cebu
| Route 840 (Cebu South Coastal Road) in Cebu City
| 2022
| current
|
|-
! Central Luzon Link Expressway
| 66
| 41
| E1 (SCTEX) in Tarlac City
| Route 1 (Maharlika Highway) in San Jose, Nueva Ecija
| 2021
| current
| Partial operation between Tarlac City and Aliaga.
|-
! NLEX–SLEX Connector
| bgcolor=#FFDEAD | 8
| bgcolor=#FFDEAD | 5
| bgcolor=#FFDEAD | E5 (NLEX Harbor Link) in Caloocan
| bgcolor=#FFDEAD | Skyway in Santa Mesa, Manila
| bgcolor=#FFDEAD | proposed
| bgcolor=#FFDEAD | —
| bgcolor=#FFDEAD |
|-
! Metro Cebu Expressway
| bgcolor=#FFDEAD | 73.7
| bgcolor=#FFDEAD | 45.8
| bgcolor=#FFDEAD | Route 81 (Naga–Uling Road) in Naga, Cebu
| bgcolor=#FFDEAD | Route 8 (Cebu North Road) in Danao, Cebu
| bgcolor=#FFDEAD | under construction
| bgcolor=#FFDEAD | —
| bgcolor=#FFDEAD | 
|-
! North Luzon East Expressway
| bgcolor=#FFDEAD | 92.1
| bgcolor=#FFDEAD | 57.2
| bgcolor=#FFDEAD | E5 (NLEX Segment 8.2) in Quezon City
| bgcolor=#FFDEAD | CLLEX in Cabanatuan, Nueva Ecija
| bgcolor=#FFDEAD | proposed
| bgcolor=#FFDEAD | —
| bgcolor=#FFDEAD |
|-
! South Luzon Expressway (Toll Roads 4 and 5) 
| bgcolor=#FFDEAD | 484
| bgcolor=#FFDEAD | 300
| bgcolor=#FFDEAD | E2 (SLEX Toll Road 3) in Calamba, Laguna
| bgcolor=#FFDEAD | Route 1 (Maharlika Highway) in Matnog, Sorsogon
| bgcolor=#FFDEAD | under construction
| bgcolor=#FFDEAD | —
| bgcolor=#FFDEAD |

Planned/proposed

 Tarlac–Pangasinan–La Union Expressway Extension 
 C-5 Expressway 
 Manila–Taguig Expressway 
 Cavite–Tagaytay–Batangas Expressway 
 Pasig River Expressway 
 Manila–Quezon Expressway 
 Manila–Bataan Coastal Road Extension 
 R-7 Expressway 
 North Eastern Luzon Expressway (NELEX)  
 Calamba–Los Baños Expressway 
 Laguna Lakeshore Expressway Dike 
Phase 1  
Phase 2 
 Cebu Trans-Axial Expressway 
 Davao City Expressway
 Quezon–Bicol Expressway 
 Misamis Oriental Expressway (MisOrEx) 
 Iloilo-Capiz-Aklan Expressway Project (ICAEx) 
Northern Access Link Expressway (NALEX)
Segment 1  
Segment 2  
Southern Access Link Expressway (SALEX)
Section 1  
Section 2  
Section 3  
Section 4

See also
 Philippine expressway network
List of toll roads

References